is a Japanese racing driver. Currently he is driving a Honda NSX GT3 Evo for Modulo Drago Corse in Super GT. He won the All Japan Grand Touring Car Championship in 2000.

He competed in the GT500 category of the Super GT series in 1995 and then from 1998 to 2013. He drove for Mugen from 1998 to 2002, for Dome from 2003 to 2009, and for Nakajima Racing from 2010 to 2013. Apart from 1995, he always drove for Honda teams, and became Honda's first champion in the series in 2000. He also won the Suzuka 1000 km three times; in 1999, 2003 and 2004.

After his initial retirement, he formed the Drago Corse team, which competed in Super GT's GT500 class in 2015 and 2016 before withdrawing from the series. Michigami and the Drago Corse team would return to Super GT in 2018, albeit competing in the GT300 class with the NSX GT3. This marked Michigami's return as a full-time competitor, and his first season as a driver-owner in the series. Drago Corse also currently competes in All-Japan Formula Three Championship as the ThreeBond Racing team.

In 2017, Michigami drove a factory Honda Civic in the World Touring Car Championship. He became the first Japanese driver in the series to finish on the podium at the Race of Macau.

Racing record

24 Hours of Le Mans results

Complete JGTC/Super GT results
(key) (Races in bold indicate pole position) (Races in italics indicate fastest lap)

‡ Half points awarded as less than 75% of race distance was completed.

Complete World Touring Car Championship results
(key) (Races in bold indicate pole position) (Races in italics indicate fastest lap)

References

External links

Official website
driverdb

1973 births
Living people
Japanese racing drivers
Formula Nippon drivers
Japanese Formula 3 Championship drivers
Super GT drivers
24 Hours of Le Mans drivers
World Touring Car Championship drivers
Dandelion Racing drivers
Team Kunimitsu drivers
Nakajima Racing drivers
Mugen Motorsports drivers
Kondō Racing drivers
Team Aguri drivers